The 2005 AHA Men's Ice Hockey Tournament was the 2nd Atlantic Hockey Men's Ice Hockey Tournament. It was played between March 9 and March 19, 2005. Play-in and quarterfinal games were played at home team campus sites, while the semifinals and championship games were played at the Quinnipiac home venue: Northford Ice Pavilion in Northford, Connecticut. By winning the tournament, Mercyhurst received the Atlantic Hockey Association's automatic bid to the 2005 NCAA Division I Men's Ice Hockey Tournament.

Format
The tournament featured three rounds of play and a play-in game. All games in the tournament are single-elimination. The play-in game consists of the eighth and ninth seeds competing to decide the final qualifier. In the quarterfinals, the first seed plays the winner of the play-in game while the second and seventh seeds, the third and sixth seeds and the fourth and fifth seeds play to determine who advances to the semifinals. of the four remaining teams, the highest and lowest remaining ranked teams play each other with the other two teams facing one another to determine the championship participants. The tournament champion receives an automatic bid to the 2005 NCAA Men's Division I Ice Hockey Tournament.

Conference standings
Note: GP = Games played; W = Wins; L = Losses; T = Ties; PTS = Points; GF = Goals For; GA = Goals Against

Bracket
Teams are reseeded after the Quarterfinals

Note: * denotes overtime period(s)

Play-In

(8) Army vs. (9) American International

Quarterfinals

(1) Quinnipiac vs. (8) Army

(2) Canisius vs. (7) Bentley

(3) Mercyhurst vs. (6) Connecticut

(4) Holy Cross vs. (5) Sacred Heart

Semifinals

(1) Quinnipiac vs. (7) Bentley

(3) Mercyhurst vs. (4) Holy Cross

Championship

(1) Quinnipiac vs. (3) Mercyhurst

Tournament awards

Three Stars of the Tournament
3 Scott Champagne (Mercyhurst)
2 Jamie Holden (Quinnipiac)
1 Matt Ella (Mercyhurst)

MVP
Scott Champagne (Mercyhurst)

References

Aha tournament
Atlantic Hockey Tournament